Canaceoides is a genus of beach flies in the family Canacidae. All known species are Oriental, Neotropical, or Australasian.

Species
C. angulatus Wirth, 1969
C. balboai Wirth, 1969
C. hawaiiensis Wirth, 1969
C. nudatus Cresson, 1934
C. panamensis (Curran, 1934)
C. scutellatus Wirth, 1969
C. setosus Wirth, 1969
C. spinosus Wirth, 1969
C. tenuistylus Wirth, 1969

References

Canacidae
Carnoidea genera